Caloptilia eolampis is a moth of the family Gracillariidae. It is known from Guyana.

References

eolampis
Gracillariidae of South America
Moths described in 1915